2015 Cairo bombing may refer to:

 2015 bombing of the Italian consulate in Cairo
 2015 Heliopolis bombing/Assassination of Hisham Barakat
 2015 Cairo Supreme Court bombing